Xylobolus is a genus of fungi in the Stereaceae family. The Dictionary of the Fungi (10th edition, 2008) estimated the genus to contain three widely distributed species; another, X. thoenii, was added in 2011. The genus was circumscribed by Petter Karsten in 1881.

References

Russulales genera
Taxa named by Petter Adolf Karsten
Stereaceae